No Apologies is the fifth studio album by American rock band Trapt. No Apologies was released on October 12, 2010, with Eleven Seven Music label. No Apologies debuted on the US Billboard 200 at number 25, selling around 15,000 copies. The first single is "Sound Off". A deluxe edition of the album was released with a bonus DVD exclusively at Best Buy.
It is the band's first album to feature guitarist Robb Torres after original guitarist Simon Ormandy left the band in 2008. It is also their last album to feature drummer Aaron "Monty" Montgomery.

Critical reception

A writer for Alternative Addiction noted how a majority of the album leans more towards rock than the pop aesthetics of the band's self-titled debut, commending Robb Torres' guitar work for being an admirable replacement for Simon Ormandy and Chris Taylor Brown for his catchy lyrical hooks. Gregory Heaney of AllMusic said that the record contains "a heavier, harder-edged sound" while still retaining the radio appeal of the band's previous works, concluding that "With this tighter, more aggressive approach, Trapt fans should be pleased to hear that the band is still able to keep things fresh after all these years."

Track listing

Chart positions

Personnel
 Chris Taylor Brown – lead vocals
 Robb Torres – guitar
 Pete Charell – bass
 Aaron 'Monty' Montgomery – drums

References

2010 albums
Trapt albums
Eleven Seven Label Group albums
Albums produced by Johnny K